This article describes the history of cricket in India from the 1945–46 season until 1960.

Events
The major and defining event in the history of Indian cricket during this period was the Partition of India following full independence from the British Raj in 1947.

An early casualty of change was the Bombay Quadrangular tournament which had been a focal point of Indian cricket for over 50 years.  The new India had no place for teams based on ethnic origin.  As a result, the Ranji Trophy came into its own as the national championship.

The last-ever Bombay Pentangular, as it had become, was won by the Hindus in 1945–46.

Domestic cricket

Ranji Trophy winners
 1945-46 – Holkar
 1946-47 – Baroda
 1947-48 – Holkar
 1948-49 – Bombay
 1949-50 – Baroda
 1950-51 – Holkar
 1951-52 – Bombay
 1952-53 – Holkar
 1953-54 – Bombay
 1954-55 – Madras
 1955-56 – Bombay
 1956-57 – Bombay
 1957-58 – Baroda
 1958-59 – Bombay
 1959-60 – Bombay

Leading players by season
The lists below give the leading first-class runscorers and wicket-takers in each domestic season.

Batsmen
 1945-46 –

Bowlers
 1945-46 –

International cricket

International tours of India

Australian Services 1945-46
For information about this tour, see : Australian Services cricket team in Ceylon and India in 1945-46

West Indies 1948-49
 1st Test at Feroz Shah Kotla, Delhi – match drawn
 2nd Test at Brabourne Stadium, Bombay – match drawn
 3rd Test at Eden Gardens, Calcutta – match drawn
 4th Test at MA Chidambaram Stadium, Chepauk, Madras – West Indies won by an innings and 193 runs
 5th Test at Brabourne Stadium, Bombay – match drawn

Commonwealth XI 1949-50

Commonwealth XI 1950-51

England 1951-52
 1st Test at Feroz Shah Kotla, Delhi – match drawn
 2nd Test at Brabourne Stadium, Bombay – match drawn
 3rd Test at Eden Gardens, Calcutta – match drawn
 4th Test at Modi Stadium, Kanpur – England won by 8 wickets
 5th Test at MA Chidambaram Stadium, Chepauk, Madras – India won by an innings and 8 runs

Pakistan 1952-53
 1st Test at Feroz Shah Kotla, Delhi – India won by an innings and 70 runs
 2nd Test at University Ground, Lucknow – Pakistan won by an innings and 43 runs
 3rd Test at Brabourne Stadium, Bombay – India won by 10 wickets
 4th Test at MA Chidambaram Stadium, Chepauk, Madras – match drawn
 5th Test at Eden Gardens, Calcutta – match drawn

Commonwealth XI 1953-54

New Zealand 1955-56
 1st Test at Lal Bahadur Shastri Stadium, Hyderabad – match drawn
 2nd Test at Brabourne Stadium, Bombay – India won by an innings and 27 runs
 3rd Test at Feroz Shah Kotla, Delhi – match drawn
 4th Test at Eden Gardens, Calcutta – match drawn
 5th Test at Nehru Stadium, Madras – India won by an innings and 109 runs

Ceylon 1955-56

Australia 1956-57
 1st Test at Nehru Stadium, Madras – Australia won by an innings and 5 runs
 2nd Test at Brabourne Stadium, Bombay – match drawn
 3rd Test at Eden Gardens, Calcutta – Australia won by 94 runs

CG Howard's XI 1956-57

Ceylon 1957-58

West Indies 1958-59
 1st Test at Brabourne Stadium, Bombay – match drawn
 2nd Test at Modi Stadium, Kanpur – West Indies won by 203 runs
 3rd Test at Eden Gardens, Calcutta – West Indies won by an innings and 336 runs
 4th Test at Nehru Stadium, Madras – West Indies won by 295 runs
 5th Test at Feroz Shah Kotla, Delhi – match drawn

Australia 1959-60
 1st Test at Feroz Shah Kotla, Delhi – Australia won by an innings and 127 runs
 2nd Test at Modi Stadium, Kanpur – India won by 119 runs
 3rd Test at Brabourne Stadium, Bombay – match drawn
 4th Test at Nehru Stadium, Madras – Australia won by an innings and 55 runs
 5th Test at Eden Gardens, Calcutta – match drawn

External sources
 CricketArchive – Itinerary of Events in India

Further reading
 Rowland Bowen, Cricket: A History of its Growth and Development, Eyre & Spottiswoode, 1970
 Vasant Raiji, India's Hambledon Men, Tyeby Press, 1986
 Mihir Bose, A History of Indian Cricket, Andre-Deutsch, 1990
 Ramachandra Guha, A Corner of a Foreign Field - An Indian History of a British Sport, Picador, 2001

1960
1960